C. sordidus may refer to:

Citharichthys sordidus, the Pacific sanddab, a flatfish species
Chlorurus sordidus, a fish species
Cynanthus sordidus, the dusky hummingbird, a bird species

Synonyms
Conuber sordidus, a synonym for Conuber sordidum, a sea snail species